The Last Slimeto is the fourth studio album by American rapper YoungBoy Never Broke Again. It was released on August 5, 2022, through Atlantic Records and Never Broke Again. It features guest appearances from Kehlani, Rod Wave, and Quavo. The album also features production from YoungBoy's in-house engineer, Jason "Cheese" Goldberg, alongside Bobby Raps, DJ Suede the Remix God, JetsonMade, OG Parker, Southside, and many more prestigious producers in the rap industry.

The Last Slimeto was supported by four singles: "Mr. Grim Reaper", "I Hate YoungBoy", "Don't Rate Me" featuring Quavo, and "Vette Motors". The album received generally positive reviews from music critics. It debuted at number two on the US Billboard 200 chart, earning 108,400 album-equivalent units in its first week.

Release and promotion
The Last Slimeto was first announced by YoungBoy Never Broke Again's in-house engineer, Jason "Cheese" Goldberg on his Instagram. It was later announced that this album would mark the end of YoungBoy's lengthy contract with Atlantic Records after his public dissatisfaction with the label. On July 5, 2022, it was announced that the entirety of the album was recorded while YoungBoy was on house arrest. On August 4, the album's track listing was revealed on YoungBoy's Instagram account.

Singles
"Mr. Grim Reaper" was released on February 8, 2022, as the album's lead single. "I Hate YoungBoy" was released on February 22, 2022, as the album's second single. "Don't Rate Me" featuring Quavo was released on May 5, 2022, as the album's third single. "Vette Motors" was released on June 10, 2022, as the album's fourth and final single; it was originally released on YouTube only.

The Last Slimeto Sampler
On April 1, 2022, YoungBoy Never Broke Again released The Last Slimeto Sampler which previewed seven new songs alongside the bottom half of the album's tracklist ranging from track 20 to track 30.

Critical reception

The Last Slimeto received generally positive reviews from music critics. Robin Murray from Clash stated "At times frustrating, 'The Last Slimeto' is never less than entertaining. A bracing, defiant gesture, it finds NBA YoungBoy embracing freedom with both hands." Writing for Pitchfork, Alphonse Pierre described the 30-track long album as "overwhelming" despite naming it "the neatest YoungBoy album." Alphonse described some tracks as "They fluctuate between fickle emotions like pain, anguish, and paranoia, usually with a hint of bitterness" while describing the album as a whole as "The Last Slimeto suppresses the knottiest and most uncomfortable aspects of his music." Mosi Reeves from Rolling Stone described the album as "overstuffed and overlong, but it’s also undeniably compelling."

Charles Lyons-Burt from Slant Magazine describes songs on the album as "[a] namely melodrama marked by fatalistic romanticism and a flirtation with the specter of death", however, he also states that the 30-track long album "start[s] to cave under its unruly duration". He describes the album's entirety as "the album merely conjures a series of—albeit passionately relayed—images of love, lust, and violence." Paul Simpson from AllMusic stated that "Sitting through the entirety of The Last Slimeto is bound to be an exhausting experience to anyone but YoungBoy's many devout fans, but even if it seems to function more as a playlist than an album, it's definitely not monotonous, and the rapper's dedication to the game is unquestioned."

Writing for HipHopDX, Scott Glaysher noted that, "as enjoyable as these five or six songs are on The Last Slimeto, its merely too long to appreciate" and that "The Last Slimeto can’t be enjoyed as a full “project” but instead a half dozen songs scattered across playlists that have the same album cover."

Year-end lists

Commercial performance
The Last Slimeto debuted at number two on the US Billboard 200 chart, earning 108,400 album-equivalent units (including 5,000 copies in pure album sales) in its first week, around 400 margins less than the week's number one album, Bad Bunny's Un Verano Sin Ti. The album also accumulated a total of 161.92 million on-demand streams of the album's songs.

Track listing

Personnel
Credits adapted from Tidal.

 Jason "Cheese" Goldberg – mastering, mixing (1-28, 30), recording (1, 5, 7-8, 10-14, 16, 18-28, 30)
 Khris James XO – mastering, mixing (29), recording (2-4, 6, 9, 10, 15, 17, 29)
 Schneider Sienes - assistant mixing (21-23, 25)

Charts

Weekly charts

Year-end charts

Certifications

References

2022 albums
Atlantic Records albums
YoungBoy Never Broke Again albums